Vladimir "Vlada" Jovanović (born 4 July 1973) is a Serbian professional basketball coach who is the head coach for Budućnost of the ABA League and the Montenegrin League.

Early career
Jovanović finished primary and high school in Čačak. He graduated from the junior college for coaches in Belgrade in 1999. He is a final year student at the Sports Academy in a basketball study group. During his playing career he was a first-team member of Borac Čačak and Železničar Čačak.

Coaching career
Jovanović started his coaching career in 1997. He was a coach of youth teams of Borac Čačak, Zemun and Partizan Belgrade. In 2005, he was added to the Partizan coaching staff as the first assistant coach to head coach Duško Vujošević. During his tenure as the Partizan assistant coach, he won five Serbian Championships (2006, 2007, 2008, 2009, and 2010), four Adriatic League titles (2007, 2008, 2009 and 2010), and three National Cup titles (2008, 2009, and 2010).

On 28 June 2010, the Partizan managing board promoted him to the club's head coach. In his first season as head coach Jovanović won Serbian Championship title, Radivoj Korać Cup and NLB League trophy. In his second season as head coach Jovanović won the Serbian Championship title and Radivoj Korać Cup. After winning Serbian Championship, he didn't renew his contract with Partizan Belgrade and signed with Donetsk as the new head coach.

In August 2018, Jovanović joined a coaching staff of the Russian team Lokomotiv Kuban. He got fired in March 2019.

On 1 June 2020, Jovanović became a head coach for Mega Bemax of the ABA League and the Basketball League of Serbia. He left the club in June 2022.

On 13 July 2022, Budućnost hired Jovanović as their new head coach.

National teams coaching career
Jovanović was also a head coach of Serbia under-18 team and has won the gold medal at the 2009 FIBA Europe Under-18 Championship in France. In summer 2010, he coached the same team at the European Championship in Lithuania where they finished fourth. In July 2011, Jovanović was originally supposed to head the Serbian u-19 team at the 2011 FIBA Under-19 World Championship in Latvia, however, the job went to Dejan Mijatović who led the team to the final where they lost to Lithuania.

In 2014, Jovanović was an assistant coach for the Montenegro national team.

Career achievements 
As head coach
 ABA League champion: 1 (with Partizan: 2010–11)
 Serbian League champion: 2 (with Partizan: 2010–11, 2011–12)
 Championship of Bosnia and Herzegovina champion: 1 (with Igokea: 2013–14)
 Serbian Cup winner: 2 (with Partizan: 2010–11, 2011–12)

As assistant coach
 ABA League champion: 4 (with Partizan: 2006–07, 2007–08, 2008–09, 2009–10)
 Serbian League champion: 4 (with Partizan: 2006–07, 2007–08, 2008–09, 2009–10)
 Serbia-Montenegro First League champion: 1 (with Partizan: 2005–06)
 Russian Cup winner: 1 (with Lokomotiv Kuban: 2017–18)
 Serbian Cup winner: 3 (with Partizan: 2007–08, 2008–09, 2009–10)

Coaching record

|- 
| align="left" rowspan=2|Partizan
| align="left" |2010–11
| 16 || 6 || 10 ||  || align="center"|Eliminated in Top 16 Stage
|- 
| align="left" |2011–12
| 10 || 4 || 6 ||  || align="center"|Eliminated in group play
|-class="sortbottom"
| align="center" colspan=2|Career||26||10||16||||

Personal life 
His son Mateja (born 2000) and daughter are basketball players.

See also 
 List of ABA League-winning coaches
 List of Radivoj Korać Cup-winning head coaches

References

External links
 Vlada Jovanović at euroleague.net

1973 births
Living people
ABA League-winning coaches
Basketball players from Čačak
KK Borac Čačak players
KK Železničar Čačak players
KK Partizan coaches
KK Igokea coaches
PBC Lokomotiv-Kuban coaches
Serbian men's basketball coaches
Serbian men's basketball players
Serbian expatriate basketball people in Bosnia and Herzegovina
Serbian expatriate basketball people in China
Serbian expatriate basketball people in Montenegro
Serbian expatriate basketball people in Russia
Serbian expatriate basketball people in Ukraine